The Australian Under-19 cricket team have been playing official Under-19 test matches since 1978. Former captains include Stuart Law, Damien Martyn, Brad Haddin, Nathan Hauritz and Cameron White who have all gone on to play international cricket for Australia. They have won the Under-19 Cricket World Cup on three occasions, in 1988, 2002 and 2010, the second-most behind India.

Under-19 World Cup record

Current squad 
The Australian squad that was selected for the 2022 ICC Under-19 Cricket World Cup is as follows: 

 Cooper Connolly (c)
 Harkirat Bajwa
 Aidan Cahill
 Joshua Garner
 Isaac Higgins
 Campbell Kellaway
 Corey Miller
 Jack Nisbet
 Nivethan Radhakrishnan
 William Salzmann
 Lachlan Shaw
 Jackson Sinfield
 Tobias Snell
 Tom Whitney
 Teague Wyllie

References

External links 
Matches played by Australia Under-19s at CricketArchive

Under-19 cricket teams
Australia in international cricket
National youth sports teams of Australia